The Fundamentals of Caring is a 2016 American road comedy-drama film written and directed by Rob Burnett, based on the 2012 novel The Revised Fundamentals of Caregiving by Jonathan Evison. Starring Paul Rudd, Craig Roberts, and Selena Gomez, the film had its world premiere at the Sundance Film Festival on January 29, 2016, and was released on Netflix on June 24, 2016.

Plot
Ben is an out-of-work writer in Seattle, avoiding his estranged wife’s attempts to serve him with divorce papers. He takes a six-week course to become a registered caregiver and is hired by Elsa, a bank office manager from England, to care for her 18-year-old son Trevor, who has Duchenne Muscular Dystrophy.

Ben adjusts to Trevor’s routine and bonds with the sardonic, sexually frustrated teenager. Trevor reveals that his father left when he was diagnosed at age 3, and sends Trevor letters which he ignores. Elsa and Trevor know Ben is coping with the death of his young son. Elsa warns Ben not to become too close to Trevor, fearing Trevor will be hurt when Ben inevitably moves on.

Trevor is fascinated with American roadside attractions, and Ben convinces Elsa to let them take a road trip. He and Trevor embark on a journey to see the world's deepest pit. Additionally, Trevor asks to visit his father, who owns a car dealership in Salt Lake City. At a gas station, Trevor develops a crush on a hitchhiker his age named Dot. When he and Ben see her again outside a diner, Ben invites her to join them on the road. Dot explains that she is heading to Denver to restart her life. Stopping at a motel, Ben suspects they are being followed by someone sent by his wife.

Traveling down the highway, they find a pregnant woman, Peaches, whose car has broken down and they offer her a ride. When they stop for the night, Trevor asks Dot on a date to the diner across the street, and she accepts. The next day, the four confront Trevor's father at his dealership. He admits although Elsa asked him to write to Trevor, he never did. Elsa wrote all the letters herself. Uninterested in connecting with his son, Trevor’s father offers him money instead, but Trevor and his companions leave. Lashing out at each other, Trevor and Ben prepare to drive home, but Dot insists they complete their journey.

Arriving at the world’s deepest pit, Trevor, Dot, and Peaches head to the bottom, while Ben waits at the top, saying he forgot his mobile. He confronts the driver who has been following them and discovers he is Dot's father, who wants to make sure she safely reaches Denver. Suddenly, Ben receives a frantic call from Dot, and he races to the bottom of the pit, fearing something has happened to Trevor. He discovers Peaches has gone into labor. He helps her deliver her baby, overcoming his guilt of his son's death, when his car, with the parking brake accidentally not fully engaged, ran over his son while Ben was unloading groceries.

Peaches and her newborn son are taken to the hospital. Dot reconciles with her father, who agrees to take her the rest of the way to Denver. She kisses Trevor before she leaves, promising to keep in touch. With a borrowed spinal board, Ben helps Trevor fulfill his wish of urinating standing up, over the rail, into the pit. Ben and Trevor return home, and Ben finalizes his divorce. He begins writing his next novel about Trevor, indicating he has remained close friends with him.

Cast 
 Paul Rudd as  Ben Benjamin
 Craig Roberts as Trevor
 Selena Gomez as Dot
 Jennifer Ehle as Elsa
 Megan Ferguson as Peaches
 Frederick Weller as Bob
 Bobby Cannavale as Cash
 Julia Denton as Janet

Production 
On October 11, 2012, Worldwide Pants' Rob Burnett and Jon Beckerman acquired the film rights to Jonathan Evison's novel The Revised Fundamentals of Caregiving. Burnett adapted and directed the film, and Donna Gigliotti and James Spies produced. On January 7, 2015, Paul Rudd was cast to play the male lead, and on January 13, Selena Gomez also joined the film.

On December 7, it was announced that the original title, The Revised Fundamentals of Caregiving, had been changed to The Fundamentals of Caring. It was later revealed Bobby Cannavale and Frederick Weller had been cast in the film as well, with Craig Roberts also added to star opposite Rudd.

Filming 
Principal photography began on January 22, 2015, in Atlanta, Georgia. In early February filming took place in Cartersville, Georgia. The shoot concluded on February 26, 2015, after 26 days of filming.

Release 
The film had its world premiere on January 29 at the 2016 Sundance Film Festival as the Closing Night Film. In January 2016, prior to its festival premiere, Netflix acquired the film's global distribution rights, and began streaming it on June 24, 2016.

Critical reception
On Rotten Tomatoes the film has a rating of 77%, based on 35 reviews, with an average rating of 7.7/10. The site's consensus reads: "The Fundamentals Of Caring gets maximum mileage out of the chemistry between its well-matched leads as it follows a fairly well-worn coming-of-age road trip route". On Metacritic, the film has a score of 55 out of 100, based on 10 critics, indicating "mixed or average reviews".

References

External links 
 The Fundamentals of Caring on Netflix
 
 

2016 films
Films based on American novels
Films shot in Atlanta
English-language Netflix original films
2010s English-language films
2010s American films
Muscular dystrophy
Films about paraplegics or quadriplegics
American road comedy-drama films
2010s road comedy-drama films